G18P or RVA/pigeon-wt/AUS/VIC/2016/G18P[17] is a strain of Rotavirus A infecting and killing domestic pigeons. This disease is found in Western Australia, Victoria, and South Australia.

References

Rotaviruses
Infraspecific virus taxa